The 1983 Oregon Ducks football team represented the University of Oregon in the 1983 NCAA Division I-A football season. Playing as a member of the Pacific-10 Conference (Pac-10), the team was led by head coach Rich Brooks, in his seventh year, and played their home games at Autzen Stadium in Eugene, Oregon.

The season-ending Civil War game with Oregon State was a scoreless  it later became known as

Schedule

Personnel

Game summaries

California

References

Oregon
Oregon Ducks football seasons
Oregon Ducks football